Khatha,  or "Gatha", as originally called in Pali Language), is the Khmer and Thai name used for Sacred Pali prayers, mantras and other magical incantations. Khatha are used in general by Thai people for a great many purposes; be it for protection, charm or business ventures, there is a Khatha which can be summoned. The word Khatha, or "Gatha" in Pali, means "Speech", and thus the original meaning of the word implies that Khatha were used only as spoken language, and not written form.
In spite of this fact, the word Khatha is used to refer to both that which is spoken, and also written.

Uses of Khatha
Khatha are used in Buddhist chanting, by Thai Ruesi practitioner for their magical spells, inscribed on Thai Buddha amulets and yantra cloths, as well as being the main body of content in Sak Yant tattooing; The sacred yantra tattoo designs are both filled with Pali Khatha, as well as being used to embellish the spaces between each of the designs too.

Image to the right shows a sacred yantra used in Thailand as amulets and shamanistic sak yant.

Khatha inscriptions

When a Khatha is inscribed on paper, cloth, metal, skin, or any other surface for that matter, it is traditionally done using the Ancient Khmer script (known as "Khom" in Thailand). The ancient Khmer script is only permitted to be used for sacred or scriptural texts, and never for common speech or everyday matters. This alphabet is considered by some Thai people to be extremely sacred and to possess spiritual power within the letters. This is the lettering seen used in Sak Yant tattoos.

Related links
Kun Khmer Warrior
Buddha Magic Ezine - The Importance of Chanting Pra Katha

Buddhism in Thailand